Rafael Serrallet (born in Valencia, Spain on July 14, 1971) is a Spanish classical guitarist.

Career

Rafael Serrallet was born in Valencia and started playing the guitar at the age of 12.

Rafael studied with Andres Segovia’s pupil and assistant, José Tomás; he also attended the Spanish Academy in Rome; and received a doctorate in music (PhD) by the Universidad Politecnica de Valencia, and a Master of Education by the UNED.

With a career spanning twenty five years and more than a thousand concerts across eighty countries, Serrallet is one of the most internationally experienced Spanish guitar concertists.

Rafael Serrallet is the first classical musician to play in all seven continents in one year. During his 2018 world tour Serrallet performed in all continents including Antarctica.

As a soloist performer, Serrallet has played with orchestras such as the Malaysian Philharmonic Orchestra, the Panama Symphony Orchestra, the Philharmonic of Morocco, the Novosibirsk Chamber Orchestra, the Transylvania State Philharmonic Orchestra, the Czech Sinfonietta and the Ukraine Philharmonic.

Besides being an acclaimed soloist, he also performs chamber music. His curiosity as a musician has led him to collaborate in cross-over projects with musicians from around the world. He has recorded many different CDs as a soloist, with orchestras, and with different chamber music groups.

Guinness World Record
Rafael Serrallet set a Guinness World Record in 2018 for being the first musician to play a concert on each continent in 154 days and 22 hours. The concerts were hold at Chicago (USA), Kuala Lumpur (Malaysia), Christchurch (New Zealand), Ushuaia (Argentina), Neko Harbour (Antarctica),  Oviedo (Spain) and Mombasa (Kenya).

Teacher
Rafael Serrallet has been a resident teacher in Santiago de Compostela Conservatory and Conservatory of Lliria in Spain and today teaches master classes in universities and conservatories throughout the world. He has also been a judge on the panel for international music competitions. Rafael has been the Director of the International Iberian Musical Institute, which developed musical projects with schools and conservatories around the world. He has conducted master classes throughout including: the University of Zagreb, University Santo Tomas of Manila, University Sultan Qaboos in Oman, Hannover University, University Teknologi Mara in Malaysia, Conservatory of Pardubice, the network of National Conservatories in Morocco, Yared Music School in the Addis Ababa University, Edward Saïd Conservatory in Jerusalem, National Conservatory of Peru, Hokoriku University (Japan), Conservatory of the UPOLI in Nicaragua, Honduras National Music School, Conservatory of the Universidad Católica de Asunción (Paraguay), Conservatoire of Kenya to name but a few.

Social Task
Rafael Serrallet wants to share his passion for music with as many people as possible. Contrary to the perception that classical music can sometimes be elitist and excluding, Rafael likes to approach it as an excellent tool for social integration. He achieves this through music pedagogical projects with disadvantaged children’s groups in Morocco, the Middle East, West Bank, countries in Africa, Central and South America and parts of Asia

Among the places where Rafael has taken his music we can name: hospitals, prisons, schools, refugee camps, elderly centres, charities… He also plays in benefit concerts in order to raise funds for campaigns such climate change, cancer, and gender violence.

References

External links
 Website
 Facebook
 Instagram
 Youtube

Spanish classical guitarists
Spanish male guitarists
1971 births
Living people
21st-century guitarists
21st-century male musicians